The following is a list of episodes of How Not to Live Your Life, a British sitcom, written by and starring Dan Clark, about a neurotic twenty-nine-year-old man who is trying to navigate his way through life but is not helped by his bad instincts.

Series overview

Episode list

Series 1: 2008

Series 2: 2009

Series 3: 2010
Series 3 of How Not to Live Your Life began on 8 November 2010 at 22:00 on BBC Three with a double-bill of both Episodes 1 and 2.

A Christmas special episode aired on 13 December 2010 on BBC Three.

Christmas Special: 2011

Webisodes
To coincide with the first broadcast of series two on UK television, a number of exclusive web videos were published on the BBC website. The specially shot scenes featured Don, Eddie and Mrs Treacher. A series of songs featuring Don and new character Jackson were also published.

References

External links
 
 

BBC-related lists
How